The Anarchists is a 1964 history book about the history of anarchism by James Joll.

References 

 
 
 
 
 Reviewed in Anarchism #46

External links 

 

1964 non-fiction books
History books about anarchism
Little, Brown and Company books